Valkosel is a village in Southwestern Bulgaria. It is located in the Satovcha Municipality, Blagoevgrad Province.

Geography 

The village of Valkosel is located in the Western Rhodope Mountains. It belongs to the Chech region.

History 

According to Vasil Kanchov, in 1900 Valkosel was populated by 800 Bulgarian Muslims.

Religions 

The population is Muslim.

Honour 

Valkosel Ridge in Antarctica is named after the village.

Notes 

Villages in Blagoevgrad Province
Chech